Electric Fields is an Aboriginal Australian electronic music duo made up of vocalist Zaachariaha Fielding and keyboard player and producer Michael Ross. Electric Fields combine modern electric-soul music with Aboriginal culture and sing in Pitjantjatjara, Yankunytjatjara and English. The duo have released an EP and several singles.

Career

2011–2020: Formation and Inma 
In 2011, Zaachariaha Fielding auditioned for the third season of The X Factor Australia, performing Tracy Chapman's "Talkin Bout a Revolution". In 2013, Michael Ross auditioned for the fifth season performing Phil Collins' "You Can't Hurry Love".

The pair has been performing as Electric Fields since 2015. Their repertoire moves across pop, soul and electronica, while being described as "Daft Punk meets Nina Simone in the Deep Forest".

In June 2016, the duo released their debut EP Inma (which derives its name from the cultural ceremony of Aṉangu women known as inma). Daniel Browning, a presenter and producer of ABC Radio National said "Co-creating music that is as exciting as it is emotionally moving – the beauty and sheer power of their musicality is breathtaking. Often featuring Zaachariaha's traditional languages of the Anangu Pitjantjatjara Yankunytjatjara people, Electric Fields music ranges from pop to epic-scale electronic works, through to intensely intimate story-songs." Their music was played at the Spirit Festival 2016 and Adelaide Fashion Festival 2016 and on Triple J.
In 2016, the duo won the Emily Burrows Award, an award given to recognise and further the professional development of original South Australian music artists or bands.

The duo won Best New Talent of the Year at the 2017 National Indigenous Music Awards. The duo was nominated for Artist of the Year at the 2018 National Indigenous Music Awards.

In December 2018, the duo was announced as one of the entrants in Eurovision - Australia Decides in an attempt to represent Australia in the Eurovision Song Contest 2019. Electric Fields performed at the competition with their song "2000 and Whatever" on 9 February 2019 and came second in both Jury and Audience vote, and second overall. In May 2019, the duo announced the Australian jury votes at the Eurovision Song Contest final. Later that year, Electric Fields toured with "2000 and Whatever" around Australia. During the performances, the duo was joined by a guitarist, a didgeridoo player and guest dancers.

In July 2019, Electric Fields received two nominations at the National Indigenous Music Awards.

On 3 April 2020, Electric Fields' collaboration with Norwegian group Keiino "Would I Lie" was released.

The duo were joined virtually by Jessica Mauboy, Missy Higgins and John Butler for a performance of  Paul Kelly and Kev Carmody‘s song about the Gurindji strike, "From Little Things Big Things Grow". The performance was recorded at the Adelaide Botanic Garden conservatory, and broadcast for the season finale of ABC Television's 6-part pandemic series, The Sound, on 23 August 2020. 

In August 2020, they performed three acoustic sets at the Ukaria Cultural Centre in Mount Barker in the Adelaide Hills, in a collaboration with online streaming platform Sunny Side Uploads.

In October 2020, the duo performed "From Little Things Big Things Grow" at the 2020 AFL Grand Final.

2021–present: Signing with Warner Music 
In November 2021, Electric Fields released they had signed a global deal with Warner Music Australia and released "Gold Energy". On 18 March 2022, the duo released "Catastrophe".

In February 2023, Electric Fields released "We the People" as the official WorldPride theme song. They performed their song to a crowd of 20,000 people at the festival’s opening concert in Sydney’s Domain on 24 February 2023, saying "Pride is not just about acceptance, but feeling at home in your own individuality".

Members

Zaachariaha Fielding 
Zaachariaha Fielding is the oldest of nine children of a family in Mimili, in the APY lands of north-west South Australia. During the COVID-19 pandemic in Australia, he went to stay with his family and started painting with his nieces and nephews. Returning to Adelaide, he joined a group of artists at the remote APY Gallery Adelaide, taking the opportunity to develop his talents in visual art. His first exhibition, Zaachariaha Fielding: Gold and Silver Linings, was mounted at the gallery from November to December 2020. His work was selected as a finalist for the Ramsay Art Prize at the Gallery of South Australia in 2021.

Michael Ross 
Michael Ross is a singer, songwriter, pianist and producer from Adelaide. Before joining Electric Fields Ross was a contestant on the X Factor Australia in 2013.

Discography

Extended plays

Singles

As lead artist

As featured artist

Other appearances

Awards

ARIA Music Awards
The ARIA Music Awards is an annual award ceremony event celebrating the Australian music industry. Electric Fields have been nominated for one award.

|-
| 2019
| 2000 and Whatever Tour
| Best Australian Live Act 
|

National Dreamtime Awards
The National Dreamtime Awards is an annual celebration of Australian Aboriginal and Torres Strait Islander achievement in sport, arts, academic and community and commenced in 2017. Electric Fields have won one award.

|-
| 2019
| Themselves
| Male Music Artist 
|

National Indigenous Music Awards
The National Indigenous Music Awards is an annual awards ceremony that recognises the achievements of Indigenous Australians in music. The award ceremony commenced in 2004. Electric Fields have won one award from four nominations.

! 
|-
| 2017
| rowspan=3|Themselves
| Best New Talent
| 
|
|-
| 2018
| rowspan=2|Artist of the Year
| 
|
|-
| rowspan="2"| 2019
| 
|
|-
| "2000 and Whatever"
| Song of the Year
| 
|
|-
| rowspan="2"| 2020
| Themselves
| Artist of the Year
| 
| rowspan="2"| 
|-
| Electric Fields and Keiino - "Would I Lie"
| Song of the Year
| 
|-
| rowspan="1"| 2022
| Themselves
| Artist of the Year
| 
| 
|-

National Live Music Awards
The National Live Music Awards (NLMAs) are a broad recognition of Australia's diverse live industry, celebrating the success of the Australian live scene. The awards commenced in 2016.

|-
| rowspan="2" |  2017
| Themselves
| South Australian Live Act of the Year
| 
|-
| Zaachariaha Fielding (Electric Fields)
| South Australian Live Voice of the Year
| 
|-
| 2018
| rowspan="3" | Themselves
| Live Electronic Act (or DJ) of the Year
| 
|-
| rowspan="3" | 2019
| Live Act of the Year
| 
|-
| Live Electronic Act (or DJ) of the Year
| 
|-
| rowspan="2" | Zaachariaha Fielding (Electric Fields)
| rowspan="2" | Live Voice of the Year
| 
|-
| 2020
| 
|-

South Australian Music Awards
The South Australian Music Awards (previously known as the Fowler's Live Music Awards) are annual awards that exist to recognise, promote and celebrate excellence in the South Australian contemporary music industry. They commenced in 2012.
 
|-
| rowspan="2" | 2019
| rowspan="2" | Themselves
| Best Aboriginal or Torres Strait Island Artist  
| 
|- 
| People's Choice Electronic Award   
| 
|-

References

Further reading

External links 
 

Australian electronic musicians
Musical groups established in 2015
Living people
Year of birth missing (living people)
South Australian musical groups
Indigenous Australian musical groups
2015 establishments in Australia